Szymon Sobala (15 January 1919 – 9 May 2009) was a Polish gymnast. He competed in eight events at the 1952 Summer Olympics.

References

1919 births
2009 deaths
Polish male artistic gymnasts
Olympic gymnasts of Poland
Gymnasts at the 1952 Summer Olympics
People from Piekary Śląskie
Sportspeople from Silesian Voivodeship